Mark Gold is the name of:

Mark Gold, English animal rights and vegetarianism activist and writer
Mark S. Gold, American medical researcher
E. Mark Gold, American physicist, mathematician and computer scientist
Mark Gold, a character in the film 17 Again

See also
Gold mark